Benozzo Federighi (died 1450) was a Roman Catholic prelate who served as Bishop of Fiesole (1421–1450).

Biography
On 17 November 1421, Benozzo Federighi was appointed during the papacy of Pope Martin V as Bishop of Fiesole. He served as Bishop of Fiesole until his death in 1450.

While bishop, he was a principal co-consecrator of Antonio Forcilioni, Archbishop of Florence (1446).
His elegant tomb monument, once in San Francesco di Paolo in Oltrarno, was moved to the church of Santa Trinita in 1895.

References 

15th-century Italian Roman Catholic bishops
Bishops appointed by Pope Martin V
1450 deaths